Baloskion tetraphyllum is a rush-like plant in the family Restionaceae. Common names include tassel rope-rush, plume rush and Australian reed.

The species was formally described in 1806 by French naturalist Jacques Labillardière in Novae Hollandiae Plantarum Specimen. He gave it the name Restio tetraphyllus. Lawrie Johnson and Barbara Briggs placed it in the genus Baloskion in 1998.

References

tetraphyllum
Taxa named by Jacques Labillardière
Plants described in 1806